Benjamin Greaves-Neal is an English  actor. His career dates back to 2010 when he made a guest appearance in the award-winning BBC sitcom My Family.

Since then Ben has appeared in 2011's horror The Awakening and 
Donald Rice's period drama Cheerful Weather for The Wedding. He is also known for his recurring role as Cousin Max in Grandpa in my Pocket.

In 2013, Greaves-Neal made a guest appearance in the BBC hospital soap Casualty as a child suffering from a vitamin overdose. The episode was titled "Hidden".

Greaves-Neal is best known for portraying Oliver in the BBC black comedy Being Human. The role has earned him praise from critics alike in the UK and USA.

In October 2015, he appeared on US television in Starz's hugely popular action drama DaVinci's Demons opposite ToRiley for its third and final season which aired on Fox.

Filmography
 Curse Of The Witching Tree (2015)
 Death Machine (2014)
 Being Human (UK series 5) (2013)
 Casualty (TV series) (2013)
 Grandpa in my Pocket (2008 - 2011)
 Cheerful Weather for the Wedding (film) (2012)
 The Awakening (2011)
 Dark Matters Twisted But True (2012)
 My Family (2010)
 Magic Grandad (2009)

External links

Living people
English male child actors
English male television actors
English male film actors
Year of birth missing (living people)